Frank Maurice Allen known as "Bunny Allen" (17 April 1906, in Upton Cum Chalvey, Buckinghamshire, England – 14 January 2002, in Lamu Island) was a renowned white hunter and safari guide in Kenya.

Biography
Allen earned the nickname "Bunny" from a Gypsy hunting companion in England for his proficiency in snaring rabbits in Windsor Forest.  He was educated at Sir William Borlase's Grammar School, Marlow, Buckinghamshire.

He arrived in Kenya in 1927 to join his two brothers.  He found work managing a farm for Mervyn Soames where he took guests out shooting.  His bush expertise drew respect from the locals and he became a hunting partner of Denys Finch Hatton.  He took part in three Royal Safaris including one where he captured cheetah by driving alongside them as they ran and jumping on their backs.

During World War II he enlisted and was later commissioned in the King's African Rifles, serving in the Battle of Madagascar and the 6th East African Campaign and finishing the war as a Captain.

He was the subject of a short film directed by Peter Hort and Mark Macauley in 1996 called A Gypsy in Africa.

Film work
Allen returned to hunting in 1946 and through his famous clients on safaris was discovered by Hollywood where he acted as a technical adviser to MGM's King Solomon's Mines as well as The African Queen, Where No Vultures Fly and Nor the Moon by Night.  He gained fame by working on John Ford's Mogambo and acted as Clark Gable's double during action scenes. See also White Hunter Black Heart.

Books
 Allen, Bunny & Claassens, Harry The Wheel Of Life: A Life Of Safaris And Romance Safari Press, 2005

See also
 List of famous big game hunters

 A Gypsy in Africa

Notes

External links
Last of the Great White Hunters https://web.archive.org/web/20110629113345/http://www.salon.com/wlust/feature/1998/03/19feature.html

1906 births
2002 deaths
Military personnel from Buckinghamshire
English hunters
People from Buckinghamshire (before 1974)
British Army personnel of World War II
King's African Rifles officers
British expatriates in Kenya